Austria competed at the 2022 Winter Olympics in Beijing, China, from 4 to 20 February 2022.

Julia Dujmovits and Benjamin Maier were the country's flagbearer during the opening ceremony. Meanwhile alpine skiers  Katharina Liensberger and Johannes Strolz were the flagbearer during the closing ceremony.

Competitors
The following is a list of the number of competitors participating at the Games per sport/discipline.

Medalists 

The following Austrian competitors won medals at the games. In the discipline sections below, the medalists' names are bolded.

Alpine skiing

Austria qualified eleven male and eleven female alpine skiers. Otmar Striedinger was qualified and selected to the team but did not start in any races.

Men

Women

Mixed

Biathlon

Based on their Nations Cup rankings in the 2020–21 Biathlon World Cup and 2021–22 Biathlon World Cup, Austria has qualified a team of 5 men and 5 women.

Men

Women

Mixed

Bobsleigh 

Based on their rankings in the 2021–22 Bobsleigh World Cup, Austria qualified 6 sleds.

Men

Women

Cross-country skiing

Austria qualified three male and four female cross-country skiers, but refused two of their female quotas.

Distance

Sprint

Figure skating

In the 2021 World Figure Skating Championships in Stockholm, Sweden, Austria secured one quota in the women's singles competition and one quota in pairs.

Freestyle skiing

Austria qualified 7 men and 6 women.

Freeski
Men

Women

Moguls

Ski cross

Luge 

Based on their rankings in the 2021–22 Luge World Cup, Austria qualified ten athletes and a relay team. The team consists of three athletes each in the individual events and two doubles sleds.

Men

Women

Mixed team relay

Nordic combined

Austria qualified 5 athletes.

Skeleton 

Based on the world rankings, Austria qualified 3 sleds.

Ski jumping

Austria qualified 5 men and 4 women.

Sara Marita Kramer, one of the gold medal favorites, tested positive for COVID-19 on 30 January, one day before the Austrian team was leaving to Beijing, and was not allowed to fly to China even though she had no symptoms.

Men

Women

Mixed

Snowboarding

Austria qualified 9 men and 5 women.

Freestyle

Parallel

Snowboard cross

Speed skating

Austria qualified 1 man and 1 woman.

Women

Mass start

References

Nations at the 2022 Winter Olympics
2022
Winter Olympics